Macrourogaleus is a genus of palaeospinacid shark from the Late Jurassic Solnhofen Limestone. It is probably related to Paraorthacodus due anatomical similarities seen in whole-body fossils of both genera.

References

External links

Prehistoric shark genera
Jurassic sharks
Palaeospinacidae
Prehistoric cartilaginous fish genera
Fossils of Germany